Memorial Stadium is a 5,200 seat multi-purpose outdoor stadium in Portland, Maine. It is located behind Deering High School in the suburban Deering Center neighborhood.

In addition to hosting Deering High School sports it is the home stadium of the GPS Portland Phoenix, an amateur team in USL League Two. It's also the home field for the Southern Maine Raging Bulls of the semi-professional New England Football League.

References

American football venues in Maine
Sports venues in Portland, Maine
High school football venues in the United States
Soccer venues in Maine